Hilltown is an unincorporated community in Montgomery Township, Jennings County, Indiana.

Geography

References

Unincorporated communities in Jennings County, Indiana
Unincorporated communities in Indiana